Samuel Mwakayeni (born 17 August 1988) is a Zimbabwean cricketer. He made his first-class debut for Northerns in the 2006–07 Logan Cup on 12 April 2007.

References

External links
 

1988 births
Living people
Zimbabwean cricketers
Manicaland cricketers
Mashonaland Eagles cricketers
Northerns (Zimbabwe) cricketers
Southern Rocks cricketers
Sportspeople from Harare